Jorge Alberto Pan (born 1954) is an Argentine backgammon player. In 2007, Pan won the 32nd World Backgammon Championship held in Monte Carlo. Pan is the first South American to win the backgammon world title. Pan is a lawyer and lives in Argentina.

References

1954 births
Living people
Backgammon players
20th-century Argentine lawyers
21st-century Argentine lawyers